Samuel Thomas Rae is an Australian politician, and a member of the Australian House of Representatives for the new seat of Hawke. He was first elected at the 2022 Australian federal election. Prior to his election he was a state secretary for the Labor Party.

References 

Living people
Australian Labor Party members of the Parliament of Australia
Members of the Australian House of Representatives for Hawke
Members of the Australian House of Representatives
21st-century Australian politicians
Year of birth missing (living people)